Kristi Lynn Kiick is the Blue and Gold Distinguished Professor of Materials Science and Engineering at the University of Delaware. She studies polymers, biomaterials and hydrogels for drug delivery and regenerative medicine. She is a Fellow of the American Chemical Society, the American Institute for Medical and Biological Engineering, and of the National Academy of Inventors. She served for nearly eight years as the Deputy Dean of the College of Engineering at the University of Delaware.

Early life and education 
Kiick first became interested in a career in the chemical sciences when she was at high school. She studied chemistry at the University of Delaware, from which she graduated summa cum laude as a Eugene du Pont memorial distinguished scholar. She was a Master's student at the University of Georgia, where she was awarded a National Science Foundation (NSF) predoctoral fellowship, and joined Kimberly-Clark as a research scientist in 1992. Kiick returned to academia for a second master's degree in polymer science and engineering at the University of Massachusetts Amherst. She completed her doctoral research at the California Institute of Technology, as a National Defense Science and Engineering Graduate (NDSEG) fellow. She completed her PhD from the University of Massachusetts Amherst on templated macromolecular synthesis in 2001 under the supervision of David A. Tirrell, prior to starting her faculty position at the University of Delaware in 2001.

Research and career 
Kiick designs polymer nanostructures for targeted therapies and hydrogel matrices for regenerative medicine. She makes use of biomimetic self-assembly, bioconjugation and biosynthesis. In particular, Kiick has worked on polymer-peptide macromolecular structures that can engage cellular targets. These include the use of polyethylene glycol (PEG) in click chemistry to form hydrogels that degrade selectively in response to molecules present in tissues and extracellular matrix. Kiick has shown it is possible to selectively release small molecule cargo with a tuned release for applications in targeted drug-delivery and vascular grafts. She has developed resilin-like polypeptides (RLP), elastomeric materials that can be cross-linked using small molecules, as well as hydrogels that contain nanoparticles for targeting tumors and inflammatory conditions. Resilin is a primary elastomeric protein that is found in insects, and helps them to jump long distances and produce sound.

She joined the faculty at the University of Delaware in 2001, and earned the rank of Associate Professor in 2007. In 2011 Kiick was promoted to the rank of Professor of Materials Science and Engineering and also named Deputy Dean of the University of Delaware’s College of Engineering. In 2019-2020 she was awarded a Leverhulme Visiting Professorship from the Leverhulme Trust and a Fulbright Scholarship from the Fulbright Program to the University of Nottingham, to develop protocols for fabricating bioelastomeric materials.

Awards and honours 
Her awards and honours include:

 2003 National Science Foundation CAREER Award
 2004 University of Delaware Francis Alison Young Scholar Award 
 2010 University of Minnesota Etter Memorial Lectureship in Chemistry
 2012 University of Delaware Trabant Award for Women's Equity
 2014 University of Southern Mississippi Bayer Distinguished Lectureship
 2014 Elected a fellow of the American Chemical Society (ACS)
 2014 Elected a fellow of the American Institute for Medical and Biological Engineering (AIMBE)
 2015 University of Southern Mississippi Covestro Distinguished Lectureship
 2019 Fulbright Program Scholar
 2019 Elected a fellow of the National Academy of Inventors

Selected publications 
Her publications include:

Personal life 
Kiick is married with two children.

References 

Living people
American women chemists
University of Delaware alumni
University of Delaware faculty
University of Georgia alumni
University of Massachusetts Amherst College of Engineering alumni
Supramolecular chemistry
1967 births
American women academics
21st-century American women